Gyurma is a blood sausage made with yak or sheep's blood in Tibetan cuisine. Rice or roasted barley flour can be added as filler. The sausage uses natural yak or sheep casing (intestine). This sausage is also consumed in the region of Sikkim, Uttrakhand and Ladakh in India and Himalayan regions of Nepal.

See also
 Kaszanka
 Black pudding
 Lap Cheong
 List of Tibetan dishes

References

External links
Photo of a sliced gyurma served in a Tibetan restaurant

Indian cuisine
Tibetan cuisine
Blood sausages
Nepalese cuisine